Zaun may refer to:

 Brad Zaun, senator in Iowa
 Gregg Zaun, former professional baseball catcher
 Jeff Zaun, association football player
 Ralph Zaun, businessman and politician
 Zaun, Meiringen, a settlement in the Swiss canton of Bern
 Zaun, a city located within Runeterra in the lore of free online game League of Legends

See also
Zauner
Zaunkönig (disambiguation)